Torquay United Football Club is an English professional association football club based in Torquay, Devon.  This is a list of players who have made 100 or more competitive appearances for Torquay United. It includes all competitive first-team matches since the club was elected into the Football League in 1927, but does not include appearances made in Wartime Leagues or local cup competitions such as the Devon Bowl.  Substitute appearances are included.

History
After joining the Football League in 1927, the first player to make 100 appearances for Torquay United was Bob Smith.  The former Plymouth Argyle left-half joined Torquay in 1928 and reached the century milestone in January 1931, narrowly beating full-back Jack Fowler to the honor by a few weeks.  Despite this, Fowler would eventually overtake Smith and set the Torquay appearance record at 190 in 1934.  However, the player with the most pre-War appearances for Torquay was Albert Hutchinson.  Beginning his career as a forward, Hutchinson eventually played at every position for Torquay (including the goalkeeper) before the Football League was abandoned in September 1939, by which point he had notched up 338 appearances for the club.

Hutchinson's record was eventually broken by winger Ron Shaw in 1955, closely followed by wing-half Dennis Lewis.  Lewis eventually overtook Shaw and retired in 1958 having set a record of 473 appearances which stood for almost 50 years.  1958 was also the year in which Sammy Collins set the club's goalscoring record at 219, a total which has yet to be surpassed.  In the 1960s, Tommy Northcott came closest to matching both records with 150 goals in 443 games, while defender Ian Twitchin joined the elite band of players to make 400 appearances for United in 1980.

Dennis Lewis's record was eventually broken by Kevin Hill in 2008 when he came on as a late substitute in the FA Trophy Final to make his 474th and final appearance for Torquay.  The current player with the most appearances for Torquay United is Lee Mansell, while Eunan O'Kane is the latest player to make 100 appearances for the club.

Players with 100 or more appearances
Statistics correct as of 3 May 2014.  Players marked in bold are still playing for the club.

Position key:
GK – Goalkeeper; 
DF – Defender;
MF – Midfielder;
FW – Forward

References
General

Specific

External links

Players
 
Torquay United F.C. players
Association football player non-biographical articles